For the 2015 season the UCI revamped the points system used to rank riders. The following table summarises the new rankings, how points are scored towards them and how points are scaled.

UCI back track
The new set of rankings was met with much consternation from many of the UCI WorldTour teams due to the nature of the points changes. Teams highlighted that they had signed riders and designed race programmes which were themselves designed around using the 2014 points system. As a result during the 2015 Tour Down Under the UCI took the decision to revert to the 2014 rankings. Therefore, for the 2015 season there will be the following rankings: UCI World Tour, Africa Tour, America Tour, Asia Tour, Europe Tour and finally Oceania Tour. Within each of these rankings there will be individual, team and nation rankings.

Rankings

UCI World Tour

Individual

Teams

Nations

UCI Continental Rankings

UCI Africa Tour

UCI America Tour

UCI Asia Tour

UCI Europe Tour

UCI Oceania Tour

References

2015 in men's road cycling